Actinophytocola xanthii is a bacterium from the genus of Actinophytocola which has been isolated from rhizosphere soil from the plant Xanthium strumarium in Tangshan, China.

References

External links
Type strain of Actinophytocola xanthii at BacDive -  the Bacterial Diversity Metadatabase

 

Bacteria described in 2017
Pseudonocardiales